R104 road may refer to:
 R104 road (South Africa)
 R104 road (Ireland)